Khushboo is a 1975 Hindi-language drama film, produced by Prasan Kapoor under the Tirupati Pictures banner, presented by Jeetendra and directed by Gulzar. It stars Jeetendra, Hema Malini and music composed by R. D. Burman. The film is based on the Bengali novel Panditmashai, by Sharat Chandra Chattopadhyay, which was earlier filmed in Bengali in 1951 by Naresh Mitra. It was prolific year for Gulzar, with two more releases in the same year, Mausam and Aandhi. The haunting song "O Majhi Re" sung by Kishore Kumar, was famous both for lyrics and melody. A couple of other songs like "Do Naino Mein Aansoo Bhare Hain" and "Bechara Dil Kya Kare" were also very popular. It was praised as a beautiful film with good acting by Sharmila Tagore, Hema Malini, Asrani and Jeetendra.

Plot
Kusum, as a child, marries Vrindavan. After some time, her father dies in a riot and blame erroneously comes to Vrindavan's father. Due to this, Vrindavan's father rejects Kusum to be his daughter-in-law. Kusum, along with her brother and mother moves to a different village away from Vrindavan's family. Now they grow up and Kusum (Hema Malini) considers herself as the wife of Vrindavan and refuses to marry anyone else. Eventually, her mother dies and her brother Kunj (Asrani) stays single as he doesn't want to marry until he sends his sister to her in-laws. On the other side, Vrindavan's (Jeetendra) father dies and he becomes a doctor. Oblivious to Kusum's feelings, he goes on to marry another girl, Lakhi (Sharmila Tagore), who was also a victim of child marriage and has no one now. They have a son, Charan (Master Raju) and Lakhi dies after some time due to illness. He moves to his own village and starts a practice there. Once he happens to visit a wealthy patient in Kusum's village where Kusum recognizes him, though he fails to as he only knows her pet name, not real name. Gradually, they come closer and Vrindavan's mother is happy to accept Kusum as her daughter-in-law. But misunderstandings develop because Kusum considers them insensitive as they not only forgot what they had done to her family, but also take her for granted now. But Vrindavan, having a soft corner for her still wishes that she would come to him. Kusum grows close to his son Charan and keeps him with her during endemic in Vrindavan's village. Finally, Vrindavan and Kusum are able to overcome egoistic barriers and unite with the blessings of her brother, Vrindavan's mother and little Charan.

Cast
 Jeetendra as Dr. Brindaban
 Hema Malini as Kusum
 Sharmila Tagore as Lakhi
 Asrani as Kunj
 Om Shivpuri as Brindaban's father
 Chandrima Bhaduri as Chaudhrain
 Dev Kishan as Munim
 Sudhir Thakkar as Sudhir
 Durga Khote as Brindaban's mother
 Farida Jalal as Manno
 Sarika as Kali
 Leela Mishra as Kusum's mother
 Master Raju as Charan (Brindaban's son)

Soundtrack
The music of the film was by R. D. Burman, and the lyrics were by Gulzar.

References

External links 
 

Films scored by R. D. Burman
1975 films
1970s Hindi-language films
Films based on Indian novels
Films based on works by Sarat Chandra Chattopadhyay
Child marriage in India
Films with screenplays by Gulzar
Films directed by Gulzar